Necrophages are organisms that obtain nutrients by consuming decomposing dead animal biomass, such as the muscle and soft tissue of carcasses and corpses. Mainly, necrophages are species within the phylum Arthropoda; however, other animals, such as gastropods and Accipitrimorphae birds have been noted to engage in necrophagy.

Necrophages play a critical role in the study of forensic entomology, as certain Arthropoda, such as Diptera larvae, engage in myiasis and colonization of the human body.

Invertebrates

Diptera 
Members of the order Diptera, such as Nematocera, Calliphoridae, Sacrophagidae, and Muscidae, as well as semi-aquatic Diptera larvae, such as Simuliidae and Chironomidae, are the most common necrophages within the Animalia kingdom. Diptera species play a critical role in forensic entomology, as they tend to colonize the human body during the early floating phase of decomposition. The flies utilize the submerged corpse as a source of food as well as an attachment site. Notably, Diptera do not specifically colonize and feed on human carcasses. Diptera species, such as Musca domestica and Chloroprocta idioidea have been observed feeding on the carcasses of other mammalian carcasses, including the Mona monkey, the European rabbit, and the Giant cane rat, as well as fish carrion. The carcass' appeal is characterized by the putridness of the odour it emits; thus, the olfactory system of Diptera species plays a role in their food selectivity. In addition, the diversity and abundance of Diptera species vary both spatially and temporally. Necrophagous Diptera, such as Calliphora vicina, tend to be concentrated in urban areas and rare in more rural areas. However, some researchers oppose this notion and claim anthropogenic impacts are negligible regarding species richness. Temporally, the necrophagous Diptera are observed in higher abundances in the summer season than the winter season. The presence of specific Diptera abundance depends on the reproductive strategy retained by the family. For example, Calliphoridae have a high larval growth rate accompanied by a low survival rate, while Sarcophagidae produce little offspring with longer life cycles. The latter is said to benefit necrophagous Diptera in particular environments, such as forests and urbanized areas.

Hymenoptera 
Particular Hymenoptera, such as members of the genus Trigona are obligate necrophages. Trigona worker bees play a similar role to the Apis genus; however, along with collecting pollen, nectar, and plant resins, Trigona workers also collect carrion from vertebrate carcasses. Although pollen is associated with higher energy value, dead tissue from vertebrate carcasses is preferred by Trigona bees because it is biochemically easier to extract energy from. The dead animal tissue and muscle replace pollen as the primary protein source. Cerumen pots are utilized by some Trigona species, such as T. necrophaga, as vesicles to store foodstuff. The foodstuff of T. necrophaga consists of both honey and carrion from vertebrate carcasses. Ultimately, the stored food is utilized by developing larvae and the worker bee itself as a source of nutrition and energy. Due to the rapid decomposition of carrion, especially in warm temperatures, the bees must efficiently metabolize the carrion to avoid rotten carrion in their cerumen pots.Trigona hypogea communicate the presence of a valuable carcass through olfactory signals. The bees create an odour trail between their nest and the prospective animal carcass; thus, the bees recruit the other nest members to respond and exploit the corpse's resources rapidly. Additionally, interspecific competition is observed in Trigona hypogea bees. The bees are observed to defend their colonized food item, including but not limited to a monkey, lizard, fish, or snake carcass, from competing necrophages, such as flies.

Coleoptera 

Coleoptera, specifically Cleridae, Dytiscidae, Scarabaeidae, Hydrophilidae, are common necrophages and, like Diptera, tend to play critical roles in forensic entomology. Dytiscidae are aquatic in both the adult and larval stages of their life cycles; thus, the beetles play a role in colonizing submerged human corpses. Through colonization, the beetles assume a predacious role and feed on the dead tissue of the body. Dytiscidae species, such as Rhantus validus, retain mouthparts characterized by curved, asymmetrical and highly sclerotized mandibles. The mouthparts have a cutting edge and a groove that allows the insect to release digestive enzymes into its prey item and maxillae with sharp teeth. Researchers matched the post-mortem skin injuries of a human corpse to the mouthparts of such beetles and, in doing so, revealed necrophagous activity in the dermis and epidermis. Notably, the necrophagy elicited by Rhantus validus also created microhabitats for other, smaller necrophages by allowing access to freshly dead internal tissue. Necrophagy amongst Coleoptera is not confined to mammalian carcasses. Necrophagous activity has been observed in Scarabaeidae species, such as Scybalocanthon nigriceps and on the fresh carcasses of Tree frogs. The beetle is observed to use its front legs and clypeus to shape the frog carrion into pellets for eventual consumption. In aquatic environments, Dytiscidae and Hydrophilidae species have also been observed to engage in the necrophagous activity of Granular toads.

Gastropoda 
Nassariidae, such as Nassarius festivus and Nassarius clarus scavenge upon dead or decaying animal matter in the intertidal zone of eulittoral soft shores. On a sandflat in Monkey Mia in the World Heritage Site of Shark Bay, Australia, Nassarius clarus acts as a necrophage and feeds on the carrion of fishes and bivalves. In the presence of carrion, the animal's proboscis performs a search reaction followed by a quick onset of feeding. When faced with a competitor, such as a hermit crab, at the site of the carrion, the Nassarius clarus attack the competition to defend their meal. Nassarius clarus are attracted to fish and bivalve carrion to a distance of 26 miles and have a heightened interest in areas where the sand has been disturbed; thus, indicating the potential presence of organic detritus or damaged fauna.

Vertebrates

Accipitrimorphae 
Necrophagy has been observed in members of the clade Accipitrimorphae, including the Egyptian vulture, Eurasian griffon, Cinereous vulture, Black vulture, Turkey vulture, and the King vulture. The birds, mainly vultures, have been noted to feed on the fleshy tissue and muscle of mammalian vertebrates, such as cows, pigs, and rabbits, as well as other birds. Additionally, the preyed upon carcasses have been recorded to be naturally deceased or the product of anthropogenic events, such as roadkill; thus, the means of prey retrieval may differ depending on spatial circumstances, such as the urbanization of a particular area. Notably, anthropogenic impacts have had adverse impacts on the biological parameters of necrophagous birds, specifically in the territory of the Azerbaijan Republic. The adverse effects include but are not limited to shortage of food, shootings of birds and nests, and removal of nestlings from nests. Due to the advances of cattle-breeding, involving indoor breeding and the utilization of dead cattle, many necrophagous birds, such as the Eurasian griffon, are losing access to nutritionally valuable cow carcasses. Therefore, the feeding ecology and the interspecific relationships of necrophagous birds are both directly and indirectly impacted by humans.

Role in Forensic Entomology 

Necrophagous Diptera and Coleoptera play vital roles in the applications of forensic entomology. Necrophagy is critical to forensic scientists because of the production of post-mortem changes on human corpses through myiasis. For example, a forensic medical examiner must determine which soft tissues have been removed as a result of necrophages post-mortem. Entomological data can be utilized in homicide cases to determine the post-mortem interval (PMI) and localize the crime. This information is indicated by the time it takes the necrophage larvae to reach a particular developmental stage; thus, the life cycle of the necrophage provides detail regarding the interval between the initial myiasis and the discovery of the corpse. Notably, the colonization of a human corpse by Diptera necrophages is positively correlated with particular injuries, such as gunshot wounds and lacerations. The nature of these injuries provides higher levels of accessibility for the necrophagous Diptera and allows them to colonize the corpse rapidly. Seasonal changes, particularly temperature changes, significantly affect the abundance and degree of myiasis of necrophages. The increase or decrease in temperature that accompanies seasonal changes determines the rate of development retained by necrophages, particularly Diptera. High temperatures lead to an exponential increase in the rate of development in Diptera. Therefore, the body temperature of a corpse is of utmost importance to necrophages, as they prefer fresh internal tissue and sexually thrive in warm environments. However, the corpse's temperature may have adverse effects on the determination of the post-mortem interval (PMI) because the necrophages' development may be rapid due to body's temperature and not the passage of time.

In addition, Coleoptera provide valuable information to forensic entomologists. Specifically, in the later stages of decomposition, Dermestidae and Cleridae have been recorded to colonize human corpses and provide insight regarding the post-mortem interval (PMI). However, researchers note that there are spatial differences that affect the latency of necrophagous Coleoptera presence.

See also
Thanatophage
Detritivore
Decomposer
Saprotrophic nutrition
Consumer-resource systems

References

Eating behaviors
Mycology
Soil biology